Federico Ramírez Méndez (born November 4, 1975 in Cartago Province) is a Costa Rican mountain biker. Ramirez represented Costa Rica at the 2008 Summer Olympics in Beijing, where he competed for the men's cross-country race. Unfortunately, he did not finish the race, before reaching the 13.4 km lap of the course.

References

External links

1975 births
Living people
People from Cartago Province
Costa Rican male cyclists
Cross-country mountain bikers
Cyclists at the 2008 Summer Olympics
Olympic cyclists of Costa Rica